Christmas Bells may refer to

Plants
Blandfordia, genus of flowering plant native to Australia
Sandersonia, a plant genus native to South Africa, of the family Colchicaceae

Art, entertainment and media

Literature
"Christmas Bells", a poem by Henry Wadsworth Longfellow that is the basis for the Christmas carol "I Heard the Bells on Christmas Day"

Music
"Christmas Bells", a song by comedy music act DJ Europe
"Christmas Bells", a song from the musical Rent
"Snoopy's Christmas", a song by The Royal Guardsmen, which contains the chorus "Christmas Bells, oh, Christmas Bells".

Television
"Christmas Bells", an advertisement for Hershey's Kisses.